Birkbeck is a surname. Notable people with the surname include:

Edward Birkbeck (1838–1907), Conservative Party politician in the United Kingdom
Elena Birkbeck (1840–1897), first wife of William Knox D'Arcy, mining entrepreneur
George Birkbeck (1776–1841), doctor, academic, philanthropist and pioneer in adult education, founder of Birkbeck, University of London
John Birkbeck (1817–1890), Yorkshireman, banker, alpinist, and pioneer potholer
Mike Birkbeck (born 1961), former baseball player
Morris Birkbeck (1764–1825), early 19th century Illinois pioneer and publicist.
Captain Robert Alexander Birkbeck, DFC, British World War I flying ace
 Simon Birckbek or Birkbeck (1584–1656), English clergyman and controversialist
The Birkbeck Twins, collective professional name of artists Daniel (Dan) and Thomas (Tom) Birkbeck, best known for portraits of cue sports figures such as Willie Mosconi and Rudolph "Minnesota Fats" Wanderone